John William Mellor PC DL QC (26 July 1835 – 13 October 1911) was an English lawyer and Liberal Party politician.

Born in London, the eldest of the eight sons of Rt Hon. Sir John Mellor, of Otterhead, Devonshire, a Judge of the Queen's Bench Division of the High Court, Mellor was educated at Trinity Hall, Cambridge.

In 1860 he married Caroline Paget, daughter of Charles Paget, MP.
 
He became a barrister of the Inner Temple in 1860, a Queen's Counsel in 1875 and a Bencher in 1877. He was Recorder of Grantham from 1871 to 1874 and Judge Advocate General from February to August 1886. In 1878 Mellor was involved in the Whistler v Ruskin libel trial.

He was Liberal Member of Parliament for Grantham from 1880 to 1886 and for Sowerby, Yorkshire from 1892 until 1904, when he retired from Parliament. In Parliament, he was Chairman of Ways and Means & Deputy Speaker to Arthur Wellesley Peel from 1893 to 1895, and was a member of the Royal Commissions on Tweed and Solway Fisheries in 1896, on the Water Supply to London in 1897, and of the Committees of Royal Commission Patriotic Fund in 1898.

He was appointed a Privy Counsellor in 1886.

References

External links 
 

1835 births
1911 deaths
Alumni of Trinity Hall, Cambridge
English barristers
Liberal Party (UK) MPs for English constituencies
Members of the Inner Temple
Members of the Privy Council of the United Kingdom
Lawyers from Devon
UK MPs 1880–1885
UK MPs 1885–1886
UK MPs 1892–1895
UK MPs 1895–1900
UK MPs 1900–1906